Clement Township is a civil township of Gladwin County in the U.S. state of Michigan.  The population was 901 at the 2010 census.

Geography

The East and Middle Branch of the Tittabawassee River runs through the southeast corner of the township.

Major highways
 runs south–north and forms most of the western boundary before curving west–east and running through the north portion of the township.

Demographics
As of the census of 2000, there were 994 people, 471 households, and 319 families residing in the township. The racial makeup of the township was 97.69% White, 0.10% African American, 0.70% Native American, 0.10% Asian, 0.40% from other races, and 1.01% from two or more races. Hispanic or Latino of any race were 0.60% of the population.

There were 471 households, out of which 15.7% had children under the age of 18 living with them, 61.4% were married couples living together, 5.1% had a female householder with no husband present, and 32.1% were non-families. 28.5% of all households were made up of individuals, and 14.0% had someone living alone who was 65 years of age or older.  The average household size was 2.10 and the average family size was 2.53.

In the township the population was spread out, with 15.9% under the age of 18, 2.5% from 18 to 24, 18.8% from 25 to 44, 36.8% from 45 to 64, and 26.0% who were 65 years of age or older.  The median age was 53 years. For every 100 females, there were 94.9 males.  For every 100 females age 18 and over, there were 97.2 males.

The median income for a household in the township was $29,286, and the median income for a family was $33,173. Males had a median income of $28,333 versus $16,818 for females. The per capita income for the township was $18,329.  About 9.3% of families and 13.7% of the population were below the poverty line, including 23.5% of those under age 18 and 6.6% of those age 65 or over.

References

External links
 Clement Township official website

Townships in Gladwin County, Michigan
Townships in Michigan
Populated places established in 1884
1884 establishments in Michigan